Robert Irving Barrow (1805-circa 1890) was an architectural illustrator, artist and engraver, several of whose works were used as the basis for popular prints, examples of which are in the collections of major museums. Some of his works are attributed to 

He was the uncle of novelist Charles Dickens, being the younger brother of Elizabeth Dickens, née Barrow, Charles' mother.

He drew and painted a number of Liverpool scenes, including St. John's Market, the Custom House, the George's Parade baths, Lord Street, Lime Street railway station, St George's Church and St James Cemetery.

He exhibited a "drawing in watercolour", St. Martin's Market, at the Liverpool Academy of Arts' exhibition in 1832.

Works with the latter two titles were also exhibited at the Royal Academy in 1834; at that time he gave two addresses, "Liverpool", and, in London, "84, Abingdon-street".

The Walker Art Gallery, Liverpool holds his watercolour St John's Market, Liverpool, and prints of New Baths, George's Parade, Liverpool (1828) and Lord Street and St George's Church, Liverpool (1828).

The British Museum holds lithographic prints of two of his works, Saint John's market Liverpool and South view of Saint James' cemetery, Liverpool The Science Museum, London, has a copy of the print of his Railway Station Lime Street Liverpool of 1838, lithographed by W. Crane of Chester and published by Thomas Kay.

References 

Architectural illustrators
1805 births
Year of death uncertain
People from the City of Westminster
British male artists
19th-century British painters
British watercolourists
19th-century British male artists